Microplexia is a genus of moths of the family Noctuidae. The genus was erected by George Hampson in 1908.

Some species of this genus are:
Microplexia albopicta (Saalmüller, 1891)
Microplexia anosibe Berio, 1959
Microplexia aurantiaca (Saalmüller, 1891)
Microplexia bicoloria Berio, 1963
Microplexia bicostata Berio, 1964
Microplexia confusa Berio, 1963
Microplexia costimaculalis Guillermet, 1992
Microplexia discreta (Saalmüller, 1891)
Microplexia elegans (Saalmüller, 1891)
Microplexia extranea Berio, 1959
Microplexia fenestrata Berio, 1963
Microplexia ferrea Hampson, 1908
Microplexia fracta Berio, 1956
Microplexia griveaudi Berio, 1963
Microplexia lithacodica Berio, 1964
Microplexia matercula (Saalmüller, 1880)
Microplexia metachrostoides Berio, 1959
Microplexia muscosa (Saalmüller, 1891)
Microplexia nephelea (Mabille, 1900)
Microplexia parmelia (Toulgoët, 1954)
Microplexia plurinephra Berio, 1959
Microplexia sagitta (Saalmüller, 1891)
Microplexia transversata Berio, 1964
Microplexia virescens (Saalmüller, 1891)
Microplexia viridaria (Kenrick, 1917)
Microplexia viridis Berio, 1963

References

Hadeninae